Guillaume Yango (born January 31, 1982 in Aubervilliers, France) is a French basketball player who played 29 games for French Pro A league club Le Mans Sarthe Basket during the 2009–2010 season and 15 games for Paris-Levallois Basket during the 2010–2011 season. Yango began his college playing career at the College of Southern Idaho. He then helped lead the University of the Pacific Tigers to NCAA Tournament First Round wins in both 2004 and 2005.

References

External links
LNB profile
FIBA profile

1982 births
Living people
BC Orchies players
Centers (basketball)
French men's basketball players
Junior college men's basketball players in the United States
Le Mans Sarthe Basket players
Pacific Tigers men's basketball players
Metropolitans 92 players
Sportspeople from Aubervilliers
Pistoia Basket 2000 players
Trikala B.C. players